Chloroalanine (3-chloroalanine) is an unnatural amino acid with the formula ClCH2CH(NH2)CO2H.  It is a white, water-soluble solid. The compound is usually derived from chlorination of serine.  The compound is used in the synthesis of other amino acids by replacement of the chloride.  Protected forms of the related iodoalanine are also known.

Chemical properties 
The hydrolysis of 3-chloro-D-alanine is catalyzed by the enzyme 3-chloro-D-alanine dehydrochlorinase:
ClCH2CH(NH2)CO2H + H2O →CH3C(O)CO2H + NH4Cl

References

Organochlorides
Non-proteinogenic amino acids
Amino acid derivatives